Antonio Gómez Roldán (born 20 June 1992) is a Spanish footballer who plays for Ripollet as a winger.

Football career
Born in La Llagosta, Barcelona, Catalonia, Gómez finished his formation with UE Castelldefels' youth setup, after joining the club from neighbouring CE L'Hospitalet in April 2011. In July, he was loaned to UDA Gramenet's reserves, and was assigned to the first-team in the 2012 summer.

On 8 May 2013, Gómez moved to CE Sabadell FC, being assigned to the reserves. On 1 September, he played his first match as a professional, coming on as a second-half substitute in a 0–3 home loss against Deportivo La Coruña in the Segunda División championship.

References

External links
 
 
 
 

1992 births
Living people
People from Vallès Oriental
Sportspeople from the Province of Barcelona
Spanish footballers
Footballers from Catalonia
Association football midfielders
Segunda División players
Tercera División players
CE Sabadell FC footballers
CF Montañesa players
CE Sabadell FC B players